Borys Piotr Przybylski (born April 21, 1998), known professionally as Bedoes, is a Polish rapper and songwriter, founder of the band 2115 Gang.

The musician belongs to the SBM Label and has furthermore collaborated with such artists as rappers Solar, Białas, White 2115, Taco Hemingway, Lanek, Young Multi, Quebonafide, and Canadian rapper Pressa. His first album,  Aby śmierć miała znaczenie, received mixed reviews and reached the 1st place of the Polish charts – OLiS, selling more than 15 thousand copies. His next two studio albums, Kwiat polskiej młodzieży (with Kubi Producent) and Opowieści z Doliny Smoków (with Lanek), in addition to reaching the 1st place of the aforementioned list, got certified three times platinum and diamond respectively.

According to the Glamrap.pl website, he was awarded Debut of the Year in 2017. The single "05:05" earned him a nomination for the 2019 Fryderyk Award in the Hit of the Year category.

Biography and career

1998–2016: Early life and beginnings of career 
Born in 1998, in Bydgoszcz, raised on the Bartodzieje estate. The rapper spent his childhood without a father, with his mother and his grandmother. At the age of 13 he began to make his first recordings, and at the age of 15 he recorded mixtapes such as Ganesha's Blessing, Gucci Watch, Najgrubszy z najmłodszych, Anubis's Throne, FR$HTILLIDIX. After graduating from junior high school, the rapper abandoned further education in favor of a music career. In 2014, he released a mixtape with 2115, TBK (To Bartodzieje Kurwo), which was released in a limited edition of 50 copies. Years later, the album made it to the list of Most Expensive and Hardest-to-Reach Albums in Polish rap. In 2016, another mixtape Squadshits was released. In the same year, the rapper got a contract on the SB Maffija label.

2016–2017: Aby śmierć miała znaczenie and beef with Filipek 
In September, the his single, "Gang, gang, gang" was released, thus the rapper announced the release of his debut album with Kubi Producent. The song reached No. 1 on the Hip-Hop chart. On December 16, another single, "Biały i młody" was released. The song, like the previous one, reached No. 1 on the Hip-Hop chart, and both hit 10 million views on YouTube in less than a year. Other singles came out in 2017, such as "NFZ," "Napad," "Raz," along with rapper from the same label Beteo, and "Kolega brata rapera." The album was released on February 17, 2017. The album reached No. 1 on the Polish charts – OLiS, selling more than 3,000 copies. The album was promoted by a nationwide tour Aby śmierć miała znaczenie Tour. Subsequently, the rapper took part in the action of the music website Popkiller, "Młode Wilki 2017." In 2017, he got into a stage conflict with rapper Filipek, who taunted him at his concert after the musician announced in an interview that he considered him the weakest rapper. The rapper started the conflict with the song, "AŚMZ," to which Filipek responded the same day with the song, "Mówię o twej karierze". The artist then issued a response "Pinokio," to which Filipek responded with the track "Łakałakałaka." The rapper ended the conflict with the song "Rocket Jump" by releasing it on Facebook. The musician was supported in the conflict by such rappers as Eldo, Te-Tris and WdoWa.

2017–2019: Kwiat polskiej młodzieży and beef with Tomb and Dixon37 
On July 19, 2017, the rapper released the single "Gustaw," thereby announcing his new album. The music video was viewed by more than 10 million people in less than six months. On December 21, 2017, another single titled "05:05" was released with Kubi Producent. On January 4, 2018, a third single "Filipiny" was released also with Kubi Producent. On February 10, 2018, Bedoes, together with his SB Mafijja crew, played a concert at Warsaw's Stodoła club. There he uttered from the stage the words "If your favorite rapper is not from SB Maffija then he is probably sucking someone's dick right now." The words outraged many rappers such as Bilon, Zary, the Dixon37 group and TPS. The latter ridiculed SB Maffija, resulting in a long-running beef between him, Śliwa opposite Białas and Avi. Such rappers as Frosti Rege and Tomb, a former member of SB Maffija, recorded disses on Bedoes. The rapper responded to Tomb with a diss titled "Wpłatomat." Tomb responded to the number with a diss titled "Fatality," to which Bedoes no longer responded due to the fact that the rapper insulted his family there and included false information about him. On June 20 of the same year, the rapper released the single "Wow," as in previous cases also with Kubi Producent.

On November 6, 2018, he released another single titled "Kwiat Polskiej Młodzieży" which was the initiator of the conflict with Dixon37. Rest Dixon37 recorded a diss on the rapper titled "Chwast Polskich Głośników" to which Bedoes responded a few hours later with the song "00:45". A labelmate and publisher Białas joined the conflict behind the rapper, resulting in a long-running beef between him and rapper Kafar Dixon37. On November 14, 2018, he released another single titled "Janosik," which achieved commercial success, reaching 39th on the Airplay chart and was played on radios in Poland. On November 30, 2018, the album premiered and debuted at No. 1 on the Polish charts – OLiS, selling more than 30,000 copies. It was certified platinum. On May 29, 2019, he released a joint song with the Golec uOrkiestra band and well-known producer Gromee titled "Górą Ty." The song became a megahit, reaching as high as No. 2 on the Airplay chart and reached No. 1 on most radio stations in Poland.

2019–present: Opowieści z Doliny Smoków, Rewolucja romantyczna, and Męskie Granie Orkiestra 2022 
On March 26, 2019, a track titled "Michelangelo" with Canadian rapper Pressa was released. It was the first announcement of the artist's new album. On June 2, 2019, the second single titled "Natchodzi lato" was released. In October, the rapper revealed that the new album would be called Opowieści z Doliny Smoków and was recorded with producer Lanek. On October 17, 2019, he released a single titled "Jesteś ładniejsza niż na zdjęciach (na zawsze)" which was recorded as a gift for the rapper's girlfriend and published on her birthday. The song was also played on Polish radio stations. On October 28, 2019, the title single from the album was released, and on November 10 the controversial single titled "1998 (mam to we krwi)" was released, where the rapper, among other things, expressed support for homosexual relationships. In November 2019, the rapper reported that his album sold more than 15,000 copies two weeks before its release.

On January 15, 2021, he released his fourth studio album Rewolucja romantyczna. It is certified double platinum.

In 2022, together with Kwiat Jabłoni and Krzysztof Zalewski, he formed the supergroup Męskie Granie Orkiestra 2022, as part of which they recorded the single "Jest tylko teraz."

Discography

Albums

Studio albums

Extended plays

Mixtapes

Singles

As lead artist

As featured artist

Other charted or certified songs

Other songs

References 

1998 births
Living people
Polish rappers
Musicians from Bydgoszcz